Zirc Abbey, formerly also Zircz Abbey,  also known as Zircensis or Boccon, is a Cistercian abbey, situated in Zirc in the Diocese of Veszprém, Hungary.

History

First period
The early history of the monastery is obscure as regards to both the names and dates. On account of the monastery being so often referred to under both these titles (Zirc or Boccon), whether Zirc and Boccon were separate abbeys cannot be definitely determined. It seems most probable that the foundation was made by Béla III, King of Hungary (1182), as the monastic domain was formerly a royal farm. Besides this grant, on which now stands the city of Zirc, many other donations were made to the nascent abbey, which soon became one of the most celebrated in the country. It was rich not only in temporal possessions but also in the spirit of fervor and religious regularity. In 1232 the foundation of  Kutjevo Abbey in the present Croatia was made from Zirc, which became its mother-house.

This happy state continued for three centuries, but decadence set in before the end of the fifteenth century, and by 1526 the ravages of the Ottoman invasion of Hungary had depopulated the monastery, not one religious remaining at the end of the year. The buildings and possessions passed into the hands of laymen.

Second period
In the seventeenth century (1609) it was acquired by Canon Mihály Monoszlay. Thenceforth it remained the property of ecclesiastics, and in 1659 it was given to Holweis, Abbot of the Cistercian Lilienfeld Abbey, who appointed Márton Újfalusy (1660) its abbot, thus reviving it. From the jurisdiction of Lilienfeld it was transferred successively to that of Klostermarienberg Abbey (Borsmonostor) (1678) and Heinrichau Abbey (1700). From the latter abbey came a number of religious who gradually restored first the monastic buildings and church (consecrated 1745) and then regular observance in its primitive vigour.

In 1810 the community, in common with many others, was expelled, but was restored in 1814 under Abbot Antonius Dreta, from which time the abbey prospered more than ever before. Under his administration the abbeys at Pilis and Pásztó were united to Zirc, as was likewise, in 1878, the abbey at Szentgotthárd. In 1923 the Congregation of Zirc was established.

After World War II and the Soviet takeover of Hungary, many of the monks gradually escaped the country.  A large number of them went to Wisconsin (USA) and served at Spring Bank in Sparta, Wisconsin, founded by Dutch monks in 1928.  By 1956, however, a small group of these Hungarian Cistercians left Wisconsin to found Our Lady of Dallas in Irving, Dallas County, Texas.

Zirc Abbey was dissolved in 1950, and its church became a parish church. The monastery was re-established in 1989 and maintains residences in Eger, Baja, Budapest, Pécs and Székesfehérvár.

References
Ambrosius Schneider, 1985: article Zirc in Lexikalische Übersicht der Männerklöster der Cistercienser im deutschen Sprach- und Kulturraum, in: Ambrosius Schneider, Adam Wienand, Wolfgang Bickel, Ernst Coester: Die Cistercienser – Geschichte, Geist, Kunst (p. 699, 3rd edn). Cologne: Wienand Verlag

Sources and external links

 Cistercensi: Zircz (1182-1527)
 Cistercensi: Zirc II (1659-1814)
 Cistercensi: Kutjevo, otherwise Gotó
 OCist.de: Die Zisterzienser Abtei Zirc, eine ungarische Schwesterabtei Himmerods 
 Catholic Encyclopedia (1913): Zircz

Cistercian monasteries in Hungary
Christian monasteries established in the 12th century
Christian monasteries established in the 17th century
20th-century Christian monasteries
Basilica churches in Hungary
Buildings and structures in Veszprém County
Tourist attractions in Veszprém County